Jack A. Marta (March 5, 1903 – June 26, 1991) was an American cinematographer who was active in hundreds of movies throughout his life.

Steven Spielberg said: "Jack was a sweetheart. He was just a kind, gentle soul who you know had never worked that fast in his entire career; none of us had, and yet there was nothing he didn’t do or couldn’t do, and he really enjoyed himself."

In 1972, Marta was nominated for the Outstanding Achievement in Cinematography for Entertainment Programming - For a Special or Feature Length Program Made for Television.

Filmography

 Hawaii Five-O
 Billy Jack Goes to Washington
 The Master Gunfighter
 Chase
 Partners in Crime
 Framed
 The Trial of Billy Jack
 Walking Tall
 You’ll Like My Mother
 Emergency!
 How to Steal an Airplane
 Duel
 A Howling in the Woods
 Company of Killers
 The Deadly Dream
 The Birdmen
 The City
 Plaza Suite
 The Name of the Game
 Dial Hot Line
 The Challenges
 Silent Night, Lonely Night
 Any Second Now
 Dundee and the Culhane
 The Perils of Pauline
 T.H.E. Cat
 The Green Hornet
 The Rat Patrol
 The Monroes
 Batman
 Cat Ballou
 Route 66
 Angel Baby
 Tallahassee 7000
 Earth vs the Spider
 The Man Who Died Twice
 Girl in the Woods
 War of the Colossal Beast
 Man or Gun
 The Bonnie Parker Story
 Juvenile Jungle
 Young and Wild
 The Notorious Mr. Monks
 Gunfire at Indian Gap
 The Crooked Circle
 Panama Sal
 The Wayward Girl
 Taming Sutton's Gal
 The Last Stagecoach West
 Beginning of the End
 The Lawless Eighties
 Spoilers of the Forest
 Affair in Reno
 Duel at Apache Wells
 Lisbon
 The Maverick Queen
 Come Next Spring
 The Last Command
 Timberjack
 Hell's Outpost
 The Shanghai Story
 Jubilee Trail
 Fair Wind to Java
 A Perilous Journey
 Ride the Man Down
 Montana Belle
 The WAC from Walla Walla
 Woman of the North Country
 The Fabulous Senorita
 Oklahoma Annie
 Pals of the Golden West
 Honeychile
 South of Caliente
 In Old Amarillo
 Oh! Susanna
 Spoilers of the Plains
 North of the Great Divide
 Sunset in the West
 Trigger, Jr.
 Rock Island Trail
 Belle of Old Mexico
 The Golden Stallion
 The Kid from Cleveland
 Brimstone
 Hellfire
 The Last Bandit
 The Far Frontier
 The Plunderers
 Night Time in Nevada
 Eyes of Texas
 The Gallant Legion
 Under California Stars
 Bill and Coo The Gay Ranchero
 On the Old Spanish Trail
 Springtime in the Sierras
 Bells of San Angelo
 Apache Rose
 That Brennan Girl
 Earl Carroll Sketchbook
 In Old Sacramento
 Murder in the Music Hall
 Dakota
 An Angel Comes to Brooklyn
 Mexicana
 Hitchhike to Happiness
 Earl Carroll Vanities
 Brazil
 Port of 40 Thieves
 Song of Nevada
 The Yellow Rose of Texas
 Man from Frisco
 My Best Gal
 Whispering Footsteps
 In Old Oklahoma
 Nobody's Darling
 The West Side Kid
 Someone to Remember
 Bordertown Gun Fighters
 Tahiti Honey
 Hit Parade of London Blackout Murders
 Ridin' Down the Canyon
 Heart of the Golden West
 X Marks the Spot
 Flying Tigers
 In Old California
 The Girl from Alaska
 Sleepytime Gal
 Cowboy Serenade
 Red River Valley
 A Missouri Outlaw
 Sierra Sue
 Down Mexico Way
 Ice-Capades
 Mountain Moonlight
 Puddin' Head
 Lady from Louisiana
 Sis Hopkins
 A Man Betrayed
 Petticoat Politics
 Robin Hood of the Pecos
 Behind the News
 The Border Legion
 Hit Parade of 1941
 Colorado
 Ride, Tenderfoot, Ride
 Earl of Puddlestone
 Girl from God's Country
 Grand Ole Opry
 Women in War
 Rocky Mountain Rangers
 Dark Command
 Pioneers of the West
 Thou Shalt Not Kill
 Saga of Death Valley
 Main Street Lawyer
 Smuggled Cargo
 Wall Street Cowboy
 Should Husbands Work?
 Mickey the Kid
 S.O.S. Tidal Wave
 My Wife's Relatives
 Blue Montana Skies
 Forged Passport
 The Night Riders
 Southward Ho
 Rough Riders' Round-up
 Pride of the Navy
 Fighting Thoroughbreds
 Red River Range
 Come On, Rangers
 Rhythm of the Saddle
 I Stand Accused
 The Night Hawk
 Man from Music Mountain
 A Desperate Adventure
 Ladies in Distress
 Under Western Stars
 Invisible Enemy
 The Higgins Family
 II Stardust
 King of the Newsboys
 Born to Be Wild
 Outside of Paradise
 Manhattan Merry-Go-Round
 The Perfect Specimen
 Heart of the Rockies
 The Sheik Steps Out
 Public Cowboy No. 1
 Range Defenders
 It Could Happen to You!
 Michael O'Halloran
 Jim Hanvey, Detective
 Navy Blues
 Hit the Saddle
 Circus Girl
 Paradise Express
 Larceny on the Air
 The Riders of the Whistling Skull
 The Mandarin Mystery
 The Bold Caballero
 Ghost-Town Gold
 Bulldog Edition
 The Gentleman from Louisiana
 Mariners of the Sky/Navy Born 
 Hearts in Bondage
 The Girl from Mandalay
The House of a Thousand Candles (1936)
 King of the Pecos
 The Leathernecks Have Landed
 Dancing Feet
 The Leavenworth Case
 Hitch Hike Lady
 The Fighting Marines
 Sagebrush Troubadour
 Harmony Lane
 1,000 Dollars a Minute
 Confidential
 Streamline Express
 Behind the Green Lights
 The Red Dance
 What Price Glory

References

External links

1903 births
1991 deaths
People from Montana
American cinematographers